Rehfisch is a surname. Notable people with the surname include:

Alison Rehfisch (1900–1975), Australian painter
Eugen Rehfisch (1862–1937), German physician 
Hans Rehfisch (1891–1960), German playwright, short story writer, and film script writer

German-language surnames